a
This is a list of airports in South Sudan, sorted by location.

South Sudan, officially the Republic of South Sudan, is a landlocked country in east-central Africa bordered by Ethiopia to the east, Kenya to the southeast, Uganda to the south, the Democratic Republic of the Congo to the southwest, the Central African Republic to the west, and Sudan to the north. South Sudan's capital and largest city is Juba.  The country is divided into 10 states.



Airports 

Airport names shown in bold indicate the airport has scheduled service on commercial airlines.

* - International airports

See also 
 Transport in South Sudan
 List of airports by ICAO code: H#HS - Sudan and South Sudan
 List of airports in Sudan
 Wikipedia:WikiProject Aviation/Airline destination lists: Africa#Sudan

References 

  - includes IATA codes
 
 Great Circle Mapper: Airports in South Sudan - IATA and ICAO codes
 World Aero Data: Airports in Sudan - ICAO codes
 List of Sudan Airports with Google Maps

South Sudan
 
Airports
Airports
South Sudan